The 1999 Bash at the Beach was the sixth Bash at the Beach professional wrestling pay-per-view (PPV) event produced by World Championship Wrestling (WCW). The event took place on July 11, 1999, from the National Car Rental Center in Fort Lauderdale, Florida.

As of 2014, the event is available on the WWE Network.

Storylines
The event featured wrestlers from pre-existing scripted feuds and storylines. Wrestlers portrayed villains, heroes, or less distinguishable characters in the scripted events that built tension and culminated in a wrestling match or series of matches.

Event

The main event was a tag team match for the WCW World Heavyweight Championship in which the person to score the deciding pinfall would win the title. The match pitted champion Kevin Nash and Sting against Randy Savage and Sid Vicious. Savage pinned Nash to win the title. Other featured matches on the card were Roddy Piper versus Buff Bagwell in a boxing match, The No Limit Soldiers (Konnan, Rey Misterio, Jr., Swoll, and B.A.) versus The West Texas Rednecks (Curt Hennig, Bobby Duncum Jr., Barry Windham, and Kendall Windham) in an elimination match and a Junkyard Invitational match, which took place in a junkyard and the match could only be won climbing over a chain link fence and escaping. Fit Finlay escaped the junkyard to win the match and the Hardcore Junkyard Invitational Trophy.

Reception
In 2015, Kevin Pantoja of 411Mania gave the event a rating of 2.0 [Very Bad], stating, "Another bad show from WCW and they are especially bad from this era. The only match that is really worth anything was the Tag Team Title bout. The only other thing on this entire card to even crack two stars was the opener and that was based on pure entertainment over wrestling skill. I had to endure Swol, topless Piper, Rick Steiner vs. Van Hammer, US Champ David Flair and a damn Junkyard match. If I find a good WCW Pay-Per-View from their last two+ years, I’ll be stunned."

Results

Eight-man tag team match eliminations

References

External links
Bash at the Beach 1999

Bash at the Beach
Professional wrestling shows in Florida
1999 in Florida
Events in Fort Lauderdale, Florida
July 1999 events in the United States
1999 World Championship Wrestling pay-per-view events